Kim Yun-ja (Hangul: 김연자, Hanja: 金練子, born May 15, 1963) is a retired female badminton player from South Korea. She is the last player to win All England Open titles in both singles and doubles.

In 1989, Kim married Sung Han-kook, a fellow world-class player who later went on to become the national team head coach. Sung and Kim's daughter Sung Ji-hyun is also a badminton player.

Career
She won two World Championship bronze medals in women's doubles, one at the 1985 IBF World Championships with Yoo Sang-hee, and another at the 1987 IBF World Championships with Chung So-young.

Achievements

Asian Championships 
Mixed doubles

Singles

Doubles

References

External links
All England champions 1899-2007
 
 

1963 births
Living people
South Korean female badminton players
Asian Games medalists in badminton
Asian Games silver medalists for South Korea
Asian Games bronze medalists for South Korea
Badminton players at the 1982 Asian Games
Badminton players at the 1986 Asian Games
Badminton players at the 1988 Summer Olympics
Medalists at the 1982 Asian Games
Medalists at the 1986 Asian Games
World Games medalists in badminton
World Games bronze medalists
Competitors at the 1981 World Games
21st-century South Korean women
20th-century South Korean women